Asbjørn Lillås (19 April 1919  –  26 May 1983) was a Norwegian politician for the Labour Party.

He was born in Nøtterøy.

He was elected to the Norwegian Parliament from Vestfold in 1961, and was re-elected on two occasions. He had previously been a deputy representative from 1954–1957 and 1958–1961.

References

1919 births
1983 deaths
Labour Party (Norway) politicians
Members of the Storting
20th-century Norwegian politicians
People from Nøtterøy